Peripheral blood lymphocytes (PBL) are mature lymphocytes that circulate in the blood, rather than localising to organs (such as the spleen or lymph nodes). They comprise T cells, NK cells and B cells.

References

Lymphocytes